Edwardsia claparedii is a species of sea anemone in the family Edwardsiidae.

Distribution
Found frequently in depths of 5–30 m on all western coasts of British Isles and Atlantic coasts of southern Europe to the Mediterranean Sea.

Habitat
Burrows in mud or muddy sand.

References

Edwardsia
Cnidarians of the Atlantic Ocean
Anthozoa of Europe
Marine fauna of Europe
Animals described in 1975